Noura Nasri is a Tunisian sport shooter. At the 2012 Summer Olympics, she competed in the Women's 10 metre air pistol.

References

Tunisian female sport shooters
Living people
Olympic shooters of Tunisia
Shooters at the 2012 Summer Olympics
Year of birth missing (living people)
21st-century Tunisian women